Lepidobolus is a plant genus in the family Restionaceae, described as a genus in 1846. The entire genus is endemic to Australia.

 Species
 Lepidobolus basiflorus Pate & Meney - WA
 Lepidobolus chaetocephalus F.Muell. - WA
 Lepidobolus deserti Gilg ex Diels & Pritz. - WA
 Lepidobolus drapetocoleus F.Muell. - SA, Vic
 Lepidobolus preissianus Nees - WA
 Lepidobolus spiralis Meney & K.W.Dixon - WA

References

Restionaceae
Poales genera
Endemic flora of Australia
Poales of Australia
Taxa named by Christian Gottfried Daniel Nees von Esenbeck